Finau is a surname. Notable people with the surname include:

Fili Finau (born 1972), Tongan-born Australian rugby union player
Inga Finau (born 1994), New Zealand rugby union player
Lupeti Finau (died 1979), Tongan civil servant and politician
Moʻale Finau (born 1960), Tongan politician
Molitoni Finau (1883–1965), Tongan politician
Peni Finau (born 1981), Fiji footballer
Salesi Finau (born 1973), Tongan rugby footballer
Tevita Finau (born 1986), New Zealand-born American football player
Tomiteau Finau (died 1984), Tongan civil servant, lawyer and politician
Tony Finau (born 1989), American golfer 

Tongan-language surnames
Surnames of Tongan origin